A razor is a bladed tool used for removing unwanted body hair.

Razor may also refer to:

Philosophy 
 Philosophical razor, a principle or rule-of-thumb used to remove unlikely explanations for a phenomenon.

Places 
 Razor (mountain), Slovenia
 Razor, Texas, a community in the United States
 Razor Hill, a hill in Hong Kong
 Razor Point, South Georgia Island, Atlantic Ocean

People 
 Razor (nickname), a list of people
 Razor Ramon, a ring name of American professional wrestler Scott Hall
 Razor Ramon Hard Gay, a ring name of Japanese wrestler Masaki Sumitani

Arts, literature, and entertainment 
 Razor's Edge (novel), a 1963 novel by Soviet writer Ivan Yefremov
 "Razor" (short story), by Vladimir Nabokov
 Razor (band), a Canadian thrash metal band formed in 1984
 The Razors, a Belgian punk-rock band formed in 1978
 "Razor", a song on the album In Your Honor by the Foo Fighters
 Battlestar Galactica: Razor, a television film
 Underbelly: Razor, a 2011 Australian television mini-series

Products and companies 
 Razor (scooter), a compact aluminum kick scooter
 Razor Entertainment, a trading cards and collectibles company based in Dallas, Texas
 Dodge Razor, a concept car introduced in 2002
 RazorUSA, a manufacturer of rideable toys

Computing 
 Razor (configuration management), Visible Systems software suite for configuration management and issue tracking
 Razor 1911, a software cracking, "warez", and computer demo group
 ASP.NET Razor, a programming syntax used to create dynamic web pages.
 Razor-qt, a free desktop environment for personal computers.
 Nexus 7 (2013) Android tablet, codename razor

Fictional characters 
 Razor (character), a superhero from the comic book series also titled "Razor"
 Hanzo the Razor, featured in a Japanese film trilogy
 Jake "Razor" Clawson, an anthropomorphic feline from the series SWAT Kats: The Radical Squadron
 Razor, from the 1987 computer game Maniac Mansion
 Razor, a character from the 1998 Manga Hunter x Hunter
 Razor (real name Clarence Callahan), the main rival character of the racing video game Need for Speed: Most Wanted

Other uses
 Gillette Stadium, a sports stadium in Foxborough, Massachusetts, nicknamed "the Razor"
 Strata SE1, a tower in London, nicknamed "Razor"

See also 
 Razor blade (disambiguation)
 Razor clam (disambiguation)
 The Razor's Edge (disambiguation)
 Razor Sharp (disambiguation)
 Steppin' Razor (disambiguation)
 
 Motorola RAZR, a mobile phone
 Razar (disambiguation)
 Razer (disambiguation)
 Rasor (disambiguation)